Area 5 can refer to:

 Area 5 (Nevada National Security Site)
 Brodmann area 5